Edward Guss Porter (May 28, 1859 – December 23, 1929) was a Canadian politician.

Born in Consecon, Prince Edward County, Canada West, the son of Robert and Hannah Porter, Porter was educated at Albert College. A lawyer, he was head of the firm Butler and Payne of Belleville, Ontario, he was a Belleville alderman for five years and Mayor of the City of Belleville, Ontario in 1891. He was elected to the Canadian House of Commons for the electoral district of Hastings West in a 1902 by-election, after the sitting MP, Henry Corby, resigned. A Conservative, he was re-elected in the following six federal elections. He resigned from parliament in 1924 in order to force a by-election as a protest against Murdock-Home Bank but was defeated.

References

External links
 
 

1859 births
1929 deaths
Conservative Party of Canada (1867–1942) MPs
Mayors of Belleville, Ontario
Members of the House of Commons of Canada from Ontario
People from Prince Edward County, Ontario